The 2016 Big Sky Conference softball tournament will be held at Wildcat Softball Field on the campus of the Weber State University in Ogden, UT from May 12 through May 14, 2016. The tournament winner will earn the Big Sky Conference's automatic bid to the 2016 NCAA Division I softball tournament. This is the first time the tournament will feature six teams. All games will be streamed online by Watch Big Sky with Jon Oglesby on the call.

Tournament

All times listed are Mountain Daylight Time.

References

Big Sky Conference softball tournament
Big Sky